The  was the 2016 edition of the annual Japanese national cup tournament, which was held from 27 August 2016 to its final on 1 January 2017.

Kashima Antlers won their fifth title after a 2–1 defeat of Kawasaki Frontale in the final after extra time.

Kashima Antlers would have qualified for the group stage of the 2017 AFC Champions League as the winner, but as they had already earned a spot by winning the 2016 J1 League, Kawasaki Frontale achieved it by way of finishing third in the 2016 J1 League.

Calendar

Participating clubs
88 clubs competed in the tournament. Eleven clubs placed 5th through 15th from the 2015 J1 League and the 2015 J2 League champions received a bye to the second round of the tournament; 2016 AFC Champions League participants entered in the fourth round. The remaining teams entered in the first round.

Schedule and results 
The matches for the first three rounds were published on 27 June 2016.

First round 
''All times given in UTC+09:00

Second round

Third round

Fourth round

Quarterfinals

Semifinals

Final

References

External links
 Japan Football Association page on the Emperor's Cup (Japanese)

Emperor's Cup
Emperor's Cup
Cup
Cup